Strumigenys veddha, is one of more than 185 species in the genus Strumigenys found in Sri Lanka.

References

External links

 at antwiki.org
Animaldiversity Web

Myrmicinae
Hymenoptera of Asia